He Zhuoyan (born 26 November 1988) is a Chinese actress and singer. She was one of the top ten finalists of the 2005 Hangzhou Super Girl singing contest. In 2006, she emerged as champion of the Zhang Jizhong category of the Chinese Yahoo Three Directors Star Search programme. She signed on with the talent agency Huayi Brothers in the same year and acted in a number of period and wuxia-themed television series produced by Zhang Jizhong. In 2007, she became the youngest person to obtain an award in the Forbes China Celebrity 100, winning the Celebrity with the Most Potential Award at the age of 18.

Life
She was educated at the Hangzhou Arts School. She started her career by participating in the Hangzhou Super Girl singing contest in 2005, winning the sixth position among the top ten finalists. The following year, she participated in the Chinese Yahoo Three Directors Star Search programme and emerged as champion of the Zhang Jizhong category. She signed on with the talent agency Huayi Brothers and started acting in period and wuxia-themed television series produced by Zhang Jizhong. She is best known for her role as one of Wei Xiaobao's seven wives, Shuang'er, in Royal Tramp, a 2008 television series based on Louis Cha's novel The Deer and the Cauldron. She has also attained recognition for her role as Wang Yanyu in Paladins in Troubled Times, an adaptation of Liang Yusheng's novel Datang Youxia Zhuan, and as Moli in Bing Sheng, a television series featuring a fictionalised life story of the ancient Chinese militarist Sun Tzu. She has also served as a spokeswoman and endorser for cosmetic and shampoo product brands, as well as appearing in the Chinese Yahoo television commercial Qianshi Jinsheng Pian together with Huang Xiaoming, her co-star in Royal Tramp.

Filmography

Film

Television

Stage performances

Discography

Awards

Advertisements and endorsements
Yahoo: Qianshi Jinsheng Pian (雅虎广告《前世今生篇》 (2006) - appeared together with Huang Xiaoming
MININURSE: Skin products "小护士"护肤品 (2006)
OSALI: Shampoo ("欧莎丽"洗发水) (2006)

References

External links
  He Zhuoyan's personal blog on Sina.com
  He Zhuoyan's official page  on Huayi Brothers website

Living people
Actresses from Zhejiang
Actresses from Hangzhou
Super Girl contestants
Musicians from Hangzhou
Chinese stage actresses
Chinese film actresses
Chinese television actresses
1988 births